Tolo Highway is a major expressway on Route 9 in Hong Kong. It connects the new towns of Sha Tin and Tai Po in the eastern New Territories, forming part of the New Territories Circular Road.

The  highway, constructed in three stages between 1985 and 1987, was so named as it skirts the western edge of Tolo Harbour.

Route description
The highway diverges from Tai Po Road near Sha Tin Racecourse. The following  of the road, running alongside the East Rail line, was built on an embankment on the west coast of Tolo Harbour towards Yuen Chau Tsai (Island House), which marks the eastern end of the Tai Po New Town. Construction began in March 1999 to expand the section to a dual four-lane carriageway and was finished in August 2003. The section below the campus of the Chinese University of Hong Kong has since become landlocked owing to the reclamation for the Hong Kong Science Park.

As the alignment crosses a number of remote ravines far away from existing roads, four bridges along the bypass had to be incrementally launched. This was the first instance of such bridge building technique being adopted in Hong Kong. Originally a dual 3-lane carriageway, this section was upgraded to a dual four-lane carriageway between August 2009 and March 2014.

The road ends at Lam Kam Road Interchange, where it connects to Fanling Highway via a viaduct and interchanges with Lam Kam Road, Tai Po Road and Tai Wo Service Road West.

Interchanges and Junctions

There are 6 junctions along Tolo Highway: Sha Tin Racecourse, Ma Liu Shui, Science Park, Island House, Tat Wan Road and Tai Po Tai Wo Road.

{| class="plainrowheaders wikitable"
|+  Tolo Highway
|-
!scope=col|District
!scope=col|Location
!scope=col|km
!scope=col|Interchange name
!scope=col|Exit
!scope=col|Destinations
!scope=col|Notes
|-
|rowspan=4|Sha Tin
|rowspan=2|Fo Tan
|style="text-align:right"|8.9
|
|style="text-align:center"|
| Tai Po Road – Sha Tin – Sha Tin, Kowloon
|Southern terminus;  continues
|-
|style="text-align:right"|8.9
|
|style="text-align:center"|3
|Sha Tin Racecourse
|Northbound exit and southbound entrance from and to  Tai Po Road – Sha Tin
|-
|rowspan=2|Ma Liu Shui
|style="text-align:right"|10.1
|rowspan=2|Ma Liu Shui Interchange
|style="text-align:center"|3A
| ( Tate's Cairn Highway) – Ma On Shan, Kowloon East
|Southbound exit and northbound entrance only
|-
|style="text-align:right"|10.1
|style="text-align:center"|4
|Chak Cheung Street / Science Park Road – Ma Liu Shui, University, Science Park
|Southbound entrance from Sui Cheung Street
|-
|rowspan=6|Tai Po
|Pak Shek Kok
|style="text-align:right"|13.4
|
|style="background:#ffdddd; text-align:center"|4A
|style="background:#ffdddd;"|Chong San Road – Pak Shek Kok, Science Park
|style="background:#ffdddd;"|No northbound exit
|-
|rowspan=2|Tai Po
|style="text-align:right"|16.0
|Island House Interchange
|style="text-align:center"|5
|Tai Po Road – Yuen Chau Tsai – Tai Po Market Yuen Shin Road – Tai Po Central, Industrial Estate
|
|-
|style="text-align:right"|17.0
|
|style="text-align:center; background:#ffdddd;"|5A
|style="background:#ffdddd;"|Tat Wan Road – Tai Po (South)
|style="background:#ffdddd;"|Northbound exit and southbound entrance only
|-
|Tai Wo
|style="text-align:right"|19.5
|Tai Po North Interchange
|style="text-align:center"|6
| Tai Po Tai Wo Road – Tai Po (North)
|
|-
|rowspan=2|Tai Hang
|rowspan=2 style="text-align:right"|20.2
|rowspan=2|Lam Kam Road Interchange
|style="text-align:center"|7
|Lam Kam Road / Tai Wo Service Road West – Shek Kong, Hong Lok Yuen
|
|-
|style="text-align:center"|
| Fanling Highway – Fanling, Sheung Shui, Yuen Long
|Northern terminus;  continues

See also
 List of expressways in Hong Kong
 Route 9 (Hong Kong)
 Tolo Harbour

References

External links

 

Expressways in Hong Kong
Route 9 (Hong Kong)
Sha Tin
Fo Tan
Pak Shek Kok
Tai Po